The Bloodhound is a 1925 American silent Western film, also classified as a Northern. It was directed by William James Craft and starred Bob Custer, David Dunbar, and Ralph McCullough.

Plot
As described in a film magazine reviews, Rambo, the father of Marie, is killed in a fight with a half-breed and with Belleau. The latter rides away. He is met by Fitzgerald, constable of the Northwest Mounted Police. When Fitzgerald hears of the killing, he sends out McKenna, sergeant of the force, whose face is familiar, it seems to Fitzgerald. The latter believes McKenna is the man who killed Rambo and pursues him after McKenna has started out to find Belleau. Marie hears of McKenna’s peril and starts in pursuit. When McKenna reaches the Belleau home, he finds Belleau wounded. He recognizes him as his long lost brother. He takes the blame of the killing upon himself. Marie reaches them and, in her love for him, pleads that he might not confess the crime. The half-breed learns that the guilt has been put on Marie’s lover. He then confesses the crime himself.

Cast
 Bob Custer as Balleau / Sergeant Bill McKenna
 David Dunbar as Rambo
 Ralph McCullough as Constable Ray Fitzgerald
 Mary Beth Milford as Marie Rambo
 Emily Barrye as Betty Belleau

References

Bibliography
 Connelly, Robert B. The Silents: Silent Feature Films, 1910-36, Volume 40, Issue 2. December Press, 1998.
 Munden, Kenneth White. The American Film Institute Catalog of Motion Pictures Produced in the United States, Part 1. University of California Press, 1997.

External links

1925 films
1925 Western (genre) films
1920s English-language films
American silent feature films
Silent American Western (genre) films
American black-and-white films
Films directed by William James Craft
Film Booking Offices of America films
Films set in Canada
1920s American films